Grêmio Recreativo Escola de Samba Estação Primeira de Mangueira, or simply Mangueira, is a samba school in Rio de Janeiro, Brazil.
It is located at the Mangueira neighborhood, near the region of Maracanã.

Mangueira is one of the most traditional samba schools in Brazil. It won the Rio de Janeiro Carnaval competition 20 times, second only to Portela (samba school) (with 22 victories). It was runner up another 20 times.

History

Early years

In the early days of samba, the community around the Mangueira hill or morro emerged as a pioneer of the Rio Carnival through its 'Cordões', in which a group of masked participants were led by a teacher with a whistle followed by a veritable percussion orchestra. In Mangueira, there were at least two Cordões: the Mountain Warriors (Guerreiros da Montanha) and the Triumphs of Mangueira (Triunfos da Mangueira). Later came the ranchos (:pt:Rancho carnavalesco), which introduced several very important concepts to the Carnival procession: the participation of women, floats, a theme to connect the procession, and the use of woodwind, brass, and string instrumentation (particularly plucked strings). They also added two special dancers, now known as master of ceremonies (mestre-sala) and flagbearer (porta-bandeira). Three ranches stood out in Mangueira: Drop of Love (Pingo de Amor), Pearl of Egypt (Pérola do Egito) and Princes of the Forest (Príncipes da Mata). By 1920 the 'carnival blocks' with elements taken from both the Cordão and Ranch traditions, along with the now familiar percussion block, debuted. These were a strong influence on the development of the other samba schools.

There were no lack of blocks in the Mangueira area. In just the Buraco Quente neighborhood, one could find the Tia Fé, Tia Tomázia and Mestre Candinho blocks. Most famous of all was the Bloco dos Arengueiros. It was Cartola, aged 19, who felt it was time to channel the natural gifts of the blocks' rogues and thus to show them in a more organized light, displaying the power and choreographic legacy of their African roots.

Then, on April 28, 1928, at a meeting at Travessa, Saião Lobato, aged 21, the arengueiros Zé Espinguela, "Seu" Euclides, Saturnino Gonçalves (father of Dona Neuma), Massu, Cartola, Pedro Cain and Abelardo Bolinha founded the First Station Block (Bloco Estação Primeira) - regarded as a predecessor to the present day carnival blocks and samba schools. This block was present at the first contest between samba dancers in the house of Zé Espinguela in 1929, one of the forerunners of the samba schools, along with Deixa Falar and Portela.

Samba School

Cartola, who later married Dona Zica, was the first bandmaster and musical director of the school and gave the final word on the choice of the name and colors: "Estação Primeira (First Station)" - because it was the first railway stop from the Brazil Central Railway Station where there was samba; the green and pink colors as a tribute to a ranch that existed in Laranjeiras, the Arrepiados. Gradually all other blocks of the hill merged their associations to it and by the 1930s and 40s, Mangueira was already included in the list of "major" samba schools of the city.

Mangueira was the first samba school that created a composers' wing, and the first to maintain, since its foundation, a unique beat of the surdo leading in the school percussion section.  On the symbol of the school, the surdo represents the samba, the laurels are the victories won as the general champion, the crown is the imperial district of São Cristóvão, and the stars, the years it won the Carnival championship. It was also the first one to develop a "front commission", or  Comissao da Frente as it is called in Portuguese and an official criterion for the parade contest, as a way for the school to show to the public the story concept for the year's event. The flag today is in green and pink stripes radiating from the center and the coat of arms - until the 1980s the school sported a pink flag with the emblem in the center.

One of the most emblematic figures of the Mangueira samba was Jamelão, who was the official school singer from 1949 until 2006 (a record 57 years) and become a true "carnival and samba institution" in Rio, with his moody ways and his powerful voice. In 2006, Jamelão suffered a cerebrovascular accident (CVA) stroke and did not record the Mangueira theme song for the official 2007 Carnival CD, nor could he march with the school any longer. (From 1950 up to that year his voice was featured in every Carnival LP and CD produced by the carnival organizers, together with those of other schools.)

1980s and beyond

Mangueira holds 20 general championship titles, and 1 Super Cup, exclusively won only in 1984, the inauguration of the Sambódromo. In 1984, Mangueira was the champion of the Carnival on Monday, Portela on Sunday. Three schools went on for the Championship Saturday where they competed in the Super Championship, and in the end the school won the general super championship of the year.

In 2007, Mangueira confronted various taboos. After 79 years, Mangueira celebrated the 80th anniversary opening the doors of its percussion drums section to women. The idea of the president of the Mangueira drums, Ivo Meirelles, to accept women in the battery of Green and Pink was controversial. Moreover, Preta Gil became queen of the Drums Section (or Queen of Drums) of the school, breaking a tradition of having only queens originating from the community, elected through a contest. Luizito replaced Jamelão as school singer. On the show, the school board prevented the big star Beth Carvalho from parading, and the legendary Nelson Sargento preferred not to parade either, possibly because his wife's costume had not been delivered. Such developments led to a certain unease in samba circles and a lot of criticism for the directors of contemporary samba schools.

In 2008, Mangueira underwent what many consider their worst crisis . First, their theme was not about the 100th Anniversary of Cartola, but on the centenary of the frevo, which is music not from Rio but from the state of Pernambuco - the first time that form of music had been featured as the school theme. Second, the choice of the Queen of Drums Section (in Portuguese Rainha de Bateria), and finally the involvement with the hill drug traffic, which resulted in  a disappointing 10th place.

On June 14, 2008, the school lost one of its greatest icons: Jamelão, the victim of multiple organ failure. The loss of Jamelão left a huge void not only in the school but also in the whole of Brazil's samba community.

In 2009, after eight years as the head of the school, Max Lopes left and was replaced by the carnivalist Roberto Szaniecki. The theme was a tribute to the Brazilian people, based on the book O Povo Brasileiro, Formação e Sentido do Brasil, by professor, anthropologist and politician Darcy Ribeiro.

After the Carnival of 2009, there was an election, won by Ivo Meirelles, who decided to shake up the structure of the school. Since then, new names have been hired and the first changes were the carnivalist Marcia Lage, the new MC and Flag Bearer, Raphael and Marcella Alves, and the creation of a trio called "The Three Tenors", comprising Luizito, Zé Paulo Sierra and Rixxah.

For 2010, the school chose the theme Mangueira is the Music of Brazil by Marcia Lage, who was removed and replaced by Jaime Cezário and Jorge Caribé.

The 2015 edition saw the school place 10th at the final standings - one of its worst finishes ever. The following year, its tribute to the beloved singer Maria Bethânia saw it win its 19th Carnival as the general champion for the Special Group. It also won its Gold Standard award (for best school and revelation of the Carnival respectively).

For 2019, the school paraded in a theme of remembrance of Brazil's Native American populations who were the first inhabitants of the country before Portuguese colonization, and finished its campaign with its 20th general championship, plus two Gold Standards (for best school and best flag bearer).

Notable Mangueirenses 

 Alcione
 Alexandre Borges
 Alexandre Pires
 Angélica
 Beth Carvalho
 Bezerra da Silva
 Caetano Veloso
 Cartola
 Camila Pitanga
 Chico Buarque
 Chico Pinheiro
 Emílio Santiago
 Flávia Alessandra
 Gal Costa 
 Isabel Fillardis
 Ivo Meirelles
 Júnior
 Leandra Leal
 Leci Brandão
 Lobão
 Maria Bethânia
 Maria Rita
 Milton Gonçalves
 Milton Nascimento
 Moreira da Silva
 Mussum
 Nelson Cavaquinho
 Nelson Sargento
 Preta Gil
 Raí
 Roberta Sá
 Rosemary
 Sérgio Cabral Filho
 Tiago Leifert
 Tom Jobim
 Vincent Cassel

Classifications

References

External links 
  Official site
  Mangueira Samba-School Profile in English 
  unofficial fan site

Samba schools of Rio de Janeiro
1928 establishments in Brazil